Piyakul Kaewnamkang is a thai former football player and football coach. He also work as sport commentator for TrueVisions.

Honours

 2011 AFF Women's Championship Winner ; 2011 with Thailand (Women's)

References
 Women's AFF Championship: Thailand lift the trophy 
 ราชนาวีหนีตาย ต้องชนะท่าเรือ ทบ.ได้ผจก.ใหม่

Piyakul Kaewnamkang
Living people
National team coaches
Piyakul Kaewnamkang
Year of birth missing (living people)
Piyakul Kaewnamkang